Minyobates steyermarki (formerly Dendrobates steyermarki) is a species of frog in the family Dendrobatidae endemic to Cerro Yapacana in southern Venezuela. It is also known by the common names of demonic poison frog, demonic poison-arrow frog, or Yapacana's little red frog. It is monotypic in the genus Minyobates.

Its natural habitat is montane tepui forest where it is common in terrestrial habitats among moss-clad rocks and breeds in bromeliads. Threats to this species include open pit gold mining, collection for the pet trade (and occasionally, for scientific purposes), and possibly wildfires, and the IUCN has assessed it as being "critically endangered".

Description
The head is broad with a partially truncated snout and an angular ridge between the eye and nostril. The front limbs are long and slender and all the fingers have discs at their tips. The first digit on the hand is longer than the second one, and the third and fourth digits have discs larger than the other two. The toes also have discs but these are smaller than those on the hands. The toes are unwebbed. The skin is finely granulated on the throat and flanks but smooth elsewhere. The dorsal surface is bright red, dull red or reddish-brown and liberally speckled with small black spots. The limbs are a similar colour to the body or may be salmon-pink. The underparts are also similar but have rather larger dark blotches.

Distribution and habitat
Minyobates steyermarki is known only from Cerro Yapacana in Venezuela. This is a tepui or table-top mountain, a raised plateau that rises abruptly from the flat land between the Orinoco and Ventuari Rivers. The plateau is entirely in the Yapacana National Park.

Behaviour
Breeding takes place in the water that collects in leaf axils and in the water-filled rosettes of bromeliads.

Status
The International Union for Conservation of Nature has assessed Minyobates steyermarki as being "critically endangered". This is because its total range is under  and, although it was said to be very common on the tepui in 1999, its numbers appear to be decreasing. Wildfires could have serious consequences for this species, its forest habitat is threatened by opencast gold mining and specimens have been removed illegally for research.

References

Amphibians described in 1971
Amphibians of Venezuela
Endemic fauna of Venezuela
Taxa named by Juan A. Rivero
Taxonomy articles created by Polbot
Amphibians of the Tepuis